Anthony Lister (born 1980) is a contemporary Australian artist. Lister helped pioneer the street art movement in his home city as a teenager. His artistic style employs charcoal, acrylic, spray paint, and oil. His exhibitions include those held at the Urban Spree Gallery in Berlin, Robert Fontaine Gallery in Miami, Allouche Gallery in New York, Olsen Gallery in Sydney and Black Art Projects in Melbourne.

Personal life
Lister was born in Brisbane, Australia in 1980. He grew up in the Brisbane suburb of Keperra. Lister attended Mitchelton State School, then Mitchelton State High School.

Lister began painting at the age of 17. He was encouraged and influenced by his grandmother who had been a painter herself for over 80 years. After graduating high school he went on to study at GRIFFITHS University's, Queensland College of Art in Brisbane, from which he then graduated in 2001. Shortly after graduating, Lister traveled to New York, where he found mentorship under Max Gimblett, one of New Zealand's most influential living artists.

Lister has since exhibited his work extensively within Australia and internationally both in the gallery and on the streets, notably with Bogan Paradise, a three-story exhibition in a disused sex shop in Sydney, Australia 2011, Los Angeles USA solo exhibition curated by Roger Gatsman 2011, Los Angeles solo show New Image Art 2011 and Unslung Heros, The Outsiders/Lazarides Gallery, London and Newcastle, UK 2012.  Lister's estranged wife and two children are featured in his "Have You Seen Them? The Listers" stickers. Photos and videos of his children are often seen in the "New" section of his official website.

Lister was arrested in 2020, accused of drugging and raping several young women. Police also seized replica pistols, drugs and electronics. He was refused bail and is currently awaiting trial. March 19, 2020 The 40 year old was granted conditional bail in the Central Local Court.

Lister's work presents fusion of culture with influences from a number of areas and genres, including street art, expressionism, pop art, and contemporary youth culture. These works are seen in galleries across the globe with solo exhibitions across Australia, United States, Europe and UK.

He is notable within the Lowbrow (art movement) and has been featured on Juxtapoz, Vogue, WoosterCollective and Highsnobiety. Commercially, Anthony Lister has worked with various international fashion, lifestyle and technological brands such as Hermès, The Standard Hotel, Westfield, Vogue Australia, Samsung and Mercedes-Benz. He has also collaborated with many well-known artists and personalities including Blek le Rat, Space Invader, Mark "Chopper" Reid and Nick Cave.

Noted as one of the top 50 most collectable Australian artists, Lister's work is included in the collections of National Gallery of Australia, David Roberts Collection, TVS Partnership, Brand & Slater Architects, Brisbane Grammar School, BHP Collection and Art Bank Australia.

Documentary-maker Eddie Martin released a short film about his career in 2017 titled 'Have You Seen the Listers?'

Bibliography

References

External links
anthonyLISTER: Official Website with online gallery

1980 births
Living people
Australian painters
People from Brisbane